Bullions is a surname. Notable people with the surname include:

Jim Bullions (1924–2014), Scottish footballer 
Peter Bullions (1791–1864), Scottish-born American minister and grammarian

See also
Bullion (disambiguation)